Events in the year 1876 in Portugal.

Incumbents
Monarch: Louis I
Prime Minister: Fontes Pereira de Melo

Events
1–7 May – Edward, Prince of Wales visits Lisbon on the final leg of an eight-month international tour.
11 October – The first edition of the Diário de Notícias da Madeira newspaper is published.
7 December – After weeks of heavy precipitation the Guadiana and Tagus rivers in southeastern Portugal burst their banks, destroying several villages in one of the worst flooding events in recorded in the country.

Arts and entertainment

Sports
Associação Académica de Coimbra – O.A.F. founded

Births

3 November – Stephen Alencastre, Roman Catholic Bishop (died 1940)
13 November – Vitorino Guimarães, economist and politician (died 1957)

Full date missing
António dos Santos, Olympic shooter (1920).

Deaths

References

 
1870s in Portugal
Portugal
Years of the 19th century in Portugal
Portugal